Rembert S. Truluck (1934–2008) was a gay theologian, Bible teacher, preacher, writer and pastor who served in Metropolitan Community Churches (MCC) in Atlanta, San Francisco, and Nashville between 1988 and 1996. He was the author of Invitation To Freedom (1993) and Steps to Recovery from Bible Abuse (2000).

Truluck was born in Clinton, South Carolina. He attended Furman University and earned a doctorate in Sacred Theology. He served from 1953 to 1973 as Southern Baptist preacher and was a professor at Baptist College at Charleston (now Charleston Southern University). After being outed to the college's Board of Trustees, he resigned  and became a pastor of MCC.

He was also interviewed in the 1993 documentary One Nation Under God.

He was working on his next book Will The Real Jesus Please Stand Up? at the time of his death from natural causes on November 14, 2008, at age 74.

Works
Invitation to Freedom: Bible Studies in Personal Evangelism (Chi Rho Press, 1993; OCLC )
Steps to Recovery from Bible Abuse (Chi Rho Press, 2000; OCLC )

References

External links
 

1934 births
2008 deaths
20th-century Baptists
20th-century LGBT people
American gay writers
Charleston Southern University people
Furman University alumni
LGBT Baptists
LGBT people from South Carolina
LGBT Protestant clergy
LGBT theologians
Metropolitan Community Church clergy
People from Clinton, South Carolina